Victor Dennis Mercredi (born March 31, 1953) is a Canadian of Métis heritage and retired professional ice hockey player. Mercredi played in the National Hockey League (NHL) and World Hockey Association (WHA) as a left winger.

Hockey career and accomplishments
Vic Mercredi's hockey career spanned a decade, from 1969 to 1980. He played for the Penticton Broncos in the British Columbia Junior Hockey League from 1969–71 and the New Westminster Bruins in the Western Canadian Hockey League from 1971-73. Mercredi was drafted 16th overall in the first round of the 1973 NHL Amateur Draft by the Atlanta Flames, and 35th overall in the 1973 WHA Amateur Draft by the Houston Aeros. He played 2 games for Atlanta in the 1974–75 season, and three games for the Calgary Cowboys during the 1975-76 WHA season. He also played for a time in Stockholm, Sweden, on the now defunct Hammarby IF Hockey team. Mercredi was the 1970-71 BCJHL MVP and voted on the BCJHL all-star first team. He was also inducted into the NWT Sport Hall of Fame in 2013 for being the first hockey player born in the Northwest Territories to play in the National Hockey League.

Political involvement
Mercredi ran for public office to the Legislative Assembly of the Northwest Territories in the 2011 Northwest Territories general election in the electoral district of Kam Lake. He finished third out of four candidates, while incumbent Dave Ramsay was re-elected.

Career statistics

Regular season and playoffs

References

External links

1953 births
Living people
Atlanta Flames draft picks
Atlanta Flames players
Baltimore Clippers players
Calgary Cowboys players
Canadian ice hockey left wingers
Canadian sportsperson-politicians
Houston Aeros draft picks
Ice hockey people from the Northwest Territories
Métis sportspeople
National Hockey League first-round draft picks
New Westminster Bruins players
Omaha Knights (CHL) players
Sportspeople from Yellowknife
Penticton Broncos players
Politicians in the Northwest Territories
Springfield Indians players
Tucson Rustlers players